Richard Loncraine (born 20 October 1946) is a British film and television director.

Loncraine was born in Cheltenham, Gloucestershire.

Loncraine received early training in the features department of the BBC, including a season directing items for Tomorrow's World. Before his career in film, he was a sculptor and the first to create a chrome Newton's cradle. In 1996, he won the Silver Bear for Best Director at the 46th Berlin International Film Festival for Richard III.

Filmography

Film
Slade in Flame (1975)
Full Circle (1977)
The Missionary (1982)
Brimstone and Treacle (1982)
Bellman and True (1987)
Richard III (1995)
My House in Umbria (2003)
Wimbledon (2004)
Firewall (2006)
My One and Only (2009)
5 Flights Up (2014)
Finding Your Feet (2017)

Television
Secret Orchards (1979)
Blade on the Feather (1980)
Wide-Eyed and Legless (1993)
Band of Brothers (2001)
The Gathering Storm (2002)
The Special Relationship (2010)

References

External links

1946 births
Living people
English television directors
English film directors
Primetime Emmy Award winners
Silver Bear for Best Director recipients
People from Cheltenham